Love is a 2020 novel by Irish author Roddy Doyle. The novel takes place in Dublin, mostly in a pub, and concerns two friends, Joe and Davy, who have reconnected for a night of drinking.

Publication
Publication of the novel in Doyle's native Ireland was pushed from June 2020 to October.

Reception
According to literary review aggregator Book Marks, the novel received mostly "Positive" reviews.

Kirkus Reviews gave the novel a negative review, writing that "By the time the novel belatedly reaches the big reveal, the reader has passed the point of caring."

References

2020 Irish novels
Novels by Roddy Doyle
Novels set in Dublin (city)
Jonathan Cape books